Arthur Nance was an American Negro league shortstop in the 1920s.

Nance played for the Chicago American Giants in 1929. In three recorded games, he went hitless in eight plate appearances.

References

External links
 and Seamheads

Year of birth missing
Year of death missing
Place of birth missing
Place of death missing
Chicago American Giants players
Baseball shortstops